Jesper Christiansen may refer to:

Jesper Christiansen (footballer, born 1978), Danish footballer
Jesper Christiansen (footballer, born 1980), Danish footballer
Jesper deClaville Christiansen (born 1963), Danish professor

See also
Jesper Christensen (born 1948), Danish actor
Jesper Bøje Christensen (born 1944), Danish harpsichordist and music researcher
Jesper Christjansen (born 1987), Danish footballer